Thomas Berry (1914–2009) was a Catholic priest of the Passionist order, cultural historian and ecotheologian.

Thomas Berry may also refer to:

 Tom Berry (baseball) (1842–1915), baseball player of the 1870s for the Philadelphia Athletics
 Tom Berry (South Dakota politician) (1879–1951), governor of South Dakota
 Tom Berry (boxer) (1890–1943), English boxer of the 1910s, 1920s and 1930s
 Tom Berry (Montana politician), Republican member of the Montana legislature
 Tom Berry (rugby union) (1911–1993), rugby union player and administrator
 Tom Berry (Australian footballer) (born 2000), Australian rules footballer
Sir Thomas Berry (politician) (died 1698), English politician

See also
Thomas Barry (disambiguation)
Thomas Bury (disambiguation)